Pelochrista apheliana is a species of moth of the family Tortricidae. It is found in western China, Mongolia, Kazakhstan and Europe, where it has been recorded from Romania and Russia.

The wingspan is 16–21 mm. Adults have been recorded on wing in June and July.

References

Moths described in 1901
Eucosmini